An iced tea spoon, also called a soda spoon or a latte spoon, is a thin spoon with a very long handle. It is used primarily in the United States, for stirring sugar or other sweeteners into iced tea, which is traditionally served in a tall glass. This is why the spoon has a very long handle.

Originally known as a parfait spoon, it is also commonly used for eating ice cream, especially floats and sundaes. As these desserts are usually served in tall glasses, regular teaspoons or dessert spoons become inconvenient choices due to their limited reach.

See also
 List of types of spoons
 Bar spoon
 Demitasse spoon
 Soda jerk

References

Spoons
Teaware
Cuisine of the Southern United States